QSO may refer to:

Quasi-stellar object or quasar
Queen's Service Order, New Zealand honour
Queensland Symphony Orchestra
The Quantic Soul Orchestra
QSO, a Q code used in commercial and amateur radio communication 
The IATA airport code for Sousse, Tunisia